Madame de La Pommeraye's Intrigues (German: Die Intrigen der Madame de La Pommeraye) is a 1922 German silent film directed by Fritz Wendhausen and starring Olga Gsowskaja, Margarete Schlegel and Grete Berger. The film was produced by Russo Film, a short-lived company backed by Decla-Bioscop which aimed to adapt literary works for the screen. The film was released shortly after Decla-Bioscop had been absorbed into the larger UFA group. It was based on a story by Denis Diderot. It premiered at the Tauentzienpalast on 20 January 1922.

Cast
 Olga Gzovskaya as Madame Pommeraye 
 Margarete Schlegel as Jeanette d'Aisnon 
 Grete Berger as Madame d'Aisnon - Her Mother 
 Alfred Abel   
 Paul Hartmann

References

Bibliography
 Hardt, Ursula. From Caligari to California: Erich Pommer's life in the International Film Wars. Berghahn Books, 1996.

External links

1922 films
Films of the Weimar Republic
German silent feature films
Films directed by Fritz Wendhausen
Films based on French novels
Films produced by Erich Pommer
Films with screenplays by Fritz Wendhausen
German black-and-white films
UFA GmbH films